The Lyceum Club, also known as the Australian Association of Lyceum Clubs and formed in 1972 from several smaller clubs, is an Australian arts, literature and social activism group for women only.  The aim of the AALC is to promote a spirit of goodwill and understanding within the Association and to enhance the enjoyment of Lyceum by providing opportunities for contact and friendship with members of other Lyceum Clubs. The first Lyceum Club was founded in London, England in 1904 by Constance Smedley.

Ethel Osborne founded a Lyceum Club in Melbourne after visiting the London club in 1910, and was elected vice-president during the first meeting on 21 March 1912.

Member groups
There are several Lyceum clubs in Australia.
 Adelaide, formed in 1922 by Dr Helen Mayo. From 1924 to 1927 club rooms were in the upper floor of member Dr. Violet Plummer's home and consulting rooms at 222 North Terrace, then at 200 North Terrace. Now located at 111 Hutt Street.
 Brisbane
 Perth, the Karrakatta Club, formed in 1894
 Melbourne, founded in March 1912 in rented premises at the corner of Collins and Elizabeth Streets, and progressively moved to larger rooms as membership grew, until in 1957 purchasing or building rooms of their own at Ridgway Place, off Little Collins Street. Membership is open to "women connected with or distinguished in literature, science, education, music or art, philanthropy, journalism, social or public service and the learned professions".
 Sydney

References

External links
 Official website
 Adelaide Lyceum Club website
 Brisbane Lyceum Club website
 Melbourne Lyceum Club website
 Karakatta Lyceum Club (Perth, Western Australia) website
 Sydney Lyceum Club website

Women's clubs in Australia
Buildings and structures in Melbourne City Centre
1972 establishments in Australia
Organizations established in 1972
Organisations based in Melbourne